Shayne P. Carter is a New Zealand musician best known for leading Straitjacket Fits from 1986 to 1994, and as the only permanent member of Dimmer (1995–2012).

Carter is a member of the New Zealand Music Hall of Fame, and has been awarded the New Zealand Herald Legacy Award (with Straitjacket Fits at the 2008 New Zealand Music Awards), and New Zealand Music Awards for Best Group and Best Rock Album (with Dimmer, 2004).

New Zealand music critic Nick Bollinger told North & South magazine in 2019: "To me, Shayne Carter really stands head and shoulders above pretty much the whole of the Dunedin scene. I mean, there were some other brilliant musicians, don’t get me wrong. But that was the era when shoe-gazing was at its peak – they wore black jerseys, stared at their shoes, and strummed their meaningful, heartfelt songs. But Shayne was different. Shayne was a rock star, and he knew it. He was actually aware of his charisma and what it meant to be a performer."

Carter published his autobiography Dead People I Have Known in 2019. In May 2020 it won both the Royal Society Te Apārangi Award for General Non-Fiction and the MitoQ Best First Book Awards: E H McCormick Prize for General Non-Fiction at the Ockham New Zealand Book Awards.

Musical history

Early career and Bored Games
Shayne Carter comes from a musical family.  He was born to a Caucasian mother and a Māori father who was adopted by a Pakeha family.

Carter attended school at Kaikorai Valley High School. While at Kaikorai in 1978, he formed the rock group Bored Games with Wayne Elsey (bass) and Fraser Batts (guitar), Jonathan Moore and Jeff Harford on drums. The group debuted at Kaikorai's talent quest in 1979, then went on to play a gig supporting Toy Love. When Elsey tired of being in the band (he and Carter having had arguments onstage at times) and left to form The Stones, he was replaced by Terry Moore. In 1981 Bored Games broke up, before the 1982 release of their only EP, Who Killed Colonel Mustard, on Flying Nun Records. Terry Moore would later join The Chills, which grew out of another Dunedin high school band, the Same. Musical historian John Dix calls Bored Games and the Same "the most important...teenage Dunedin bands" during the emergence of the Dunedin sound.

After finishing high school, Carter worked at Radio 4XO as a journalist for 2½ years, and later worked for fledgling campus radio station Radio One.

The DoubleHappys
In 1983, Carter reunited with former Bored Games bandmate Wayne Elsey. Elsey's band The Stones split up in August 1983, so he and Carter formed DoubleHappys, along with a temperamental toy drum machine they called "Herbie Fuckface".

Carter and Elsey eventually recruited their high school friend John Collie to replace the machine before touring New Zealand with Flying Nun's Looney Tour in 1984. The same year they recorded the "Double B-Side" 7" single. In 1985, the group released the "Cut It Out" EP. While on tour later that year, Wayne Elsey was killed in a freak accident on a train.

Straitjacket Fits

Carter and Collie continued on the year after Elsey's death, recruiting David Wood (bass) and Andrew Brough (guitar, vocals) and naming the new band Straitjacket Fits. The band then recorded their first EP, Life in One Chord. Straitjacket Fits were considered the best of the bands to emerge from Dunedin at that time, although they had built more of a solid following overseas than in New Zealand. Brough, who also contributed songwriting, had a style that contrasted with Carter's. Brough's songs concentrated on melodies and pop-hooks while Carter's songs were more guitar-driven and edgy.

The band then moved briefly to Christchurch before settling in Auckland. They released their first album Hail in 1988. They recorded Melt in 1990. Due to musical difference with Carter, Brough left the band and was replaced by Mark Petersen. By the time they put out Blow in 1993, the band signed to Arista records to a potentially lucrative worldwide deal. However, by 1994, they had broken up.

Straitjacket Fits reformed for a reunion tour during April and May 2005 without Andrew Brough.

Shayne Carter & Peter Jefferies
Shayne has released 2 singles with Peter Jefferies:
 "Randolph's Going Home/Hooked, Lined And Sunken", 1986, Flying Nun Records FNCJ001
 "Knocked Out Or Thereabouts/Spark Off A Wire", 1992, Flying Nun Records FN236

Dimmer

Following the demise of Straitjacket Fits, in 1995 Carter formed the group Dimmer. This began largely as a solo project with Carter as the creative nucleus, working with different musicians for recordings and performances. In its later years, Dimmer was a settled four-piece band.

There were four Dimmer albums released, with You've Got To Hear the Music (2004) the most successful. It was certified Gold in New Zealand, and led to New Zealand Music Awards for Best Album and Best Group and was critically acclaimed by critics such as Nick Bollinger.

Carter disbanded Dimmer in 2012 with a series of final concerts in Auckland and Wellington.

The Adults
In 2011, Carter joined The Adults, a New Zealand super-group formed by Jon Toogood of the band Shihad. Along with Julia Deans he performed on & co-wrote some of the songs on their debut album, and was also part of the touring ensemble.

Shayne P Carter, Offsider
At the same time as calling an end to Dimmer in 2012, Carter described a new plan to learn piano, and record an album with it as the main instrument. Piano became part of his live shows in 2014, and in August that year he launched a crowdfunding campaign for "a new album in its final stages of production" - written entirely on piano, and recorded ("free of record company backing") with Gary Sullivan and other guests. The successful campaign had a goal of $8,000 and raised over $9,500.

Performing and recording as Shayne P Carter, he announced the album name Offsider in 2015. The first music released from Offsider came out more than a year later, in June 2016, when the song 'We Will Rise Again' appeared as a digital download.

Discography

Albums

Singles

Awards

Aotearoa Music Awards
The Aotearoa Music Awards (previously known as New Zealand Music Awards (NZMA)) are an annual awards night celebrating excellence in New Zealand music and have been presented annually since 1965.

! 
|-
| 2008 || Shayne Carter (as part of Straitjacket Fits) || New Zealand Music Hall of Fame ||  || 
|-

References

External links
 Shayne P. Carter on Bandcamp
 Straitjacket Fits biography on Flying Nun website

APRA Award winners
Living people
Musicians from Dunedin
Flying Nun Records artists
People educated at Kaikorai Valley College
Dunedin Sound musicians
Year of birth missing (living people)
The Adults members
Straitjacket Fits members